Samuel Clowes (17 September 1864 – 25 March 1928) was an English Labour Party politician who sat in the House of Commons from 1924 to 1928.

Born in Milton, Staffordshire, Clowes was secretary of the National Society of Pottery Workers from 1916.  He also served as president of the National Council of the Pottery Industry.

Clowes was a supporter of the Labour Party, and served on Stoke-on-Trent City Council. He was elected as the member of parliament (MP) for the Hanley division of Stoke-on-Trent at the 1924 general election. He held the seat for four years, until his death in 1928, aged 63.

References

External links
 

1864 births
1928 deaths
Ceramic and Allied Trades Union-sponsored MPs
General Secretaries of the Ceramic and Allied Trades Union
Labour Party (UK) MPs for English constituencies
People from Stoke-on-Trent
Trade unionists from Staffordshire
UK MPs 1924–1929
Politicians from Staffordshire